"I Will Wait" is a song by American rock group Hootie & the Blowfish. It was released in August 1998 as the lead single from their third studio album, Musical Chairs. In the United States, it peaked at number 28 on the Adult Contemporary music chart, and number three on the Adult Top 40 music chart. The song reached number seven in Canada.

Background and writing
Rucker stated in an interview with Billboard that he wrote the song about his best friend's parents, the husband was in the military and the wife was always waiting for him to get home.

Music video
The music video was directed by Ulf Buddensieck.

Charts

Weekly charts

References

1998 songs
1998 singles
Hootie & the Blowfish songs
Songs written by Darius Rucker
Songs written by Jim Sonefeld
Songs written by Mark Bryan
Song recordings produced by Don Gehman